The 1982–83 Segunda División was the 34th season of the Mexican Segunda División. The season started on 21 August 1982 and concluded on 20 May 1983. It was won by Unión de Curtidores.

Changes 
 Oaxtepec was promoted to Primera División.
 Tampico was relegated from Primera División.
 Poza Rica was promoted from Tercera División.
 Bachilleres, Irapuato, Lobos de Tlaxcala, Tuberos de Veracruz and Coyotes were relegated from Segunda División.
 Brujas was bought by new owners, was relocated at Querétaro City and renamed as Club Querétaro.
 Estado de México was renamed as Texcoco.
 Tapatío returned to Guadalajara.

As of this season, the competition system was modified. The 20 teams were divided into two zones of 10 teams, which played each other four times during the regular season.

Teams

Western Zone

Group 1

Group 2

Results

First leg

Second leg

Eastern Zone

Group 3

Group 4

Results

First leg

Second leg

Final stage

Group 1

Group 2

Final

References 

1982–83 in Mexican football
Segunda División de México seasons